Following is a list of Dutch urban designers and planners in alphabetical order:


A - B - C - D - E - F - G - H - I - J - K - L - M - N - O - P - Q - R - S - T - U - V - W - X - Y - Z

B
Jacob B. Bakema
Hendrik Petrus Berlage
Jo van den Broek
Pi de Bruijn

C
Kees Christiaanse
Jo Coenen

D
Willem Marinus Dudok

E
Aldo van Eyck

G
Marinus Jan Granpré Molière

K
Rem Koolhaas

O
Jacobus Oud

Q
Quadrat

S

Sjoerd Soeters

W
West 8

See also
List of urban designers and planners
List of urban theorists
List of Dutch architects

Dutch
Urban planning in the Netherlands
Urban designers and planners
Dutch urban planners
Urban designers